The 2013 International Women's Club Championship was the second worldwide international women's football club tournament, and was held in Japan from 30 November–8 December 2013. Five teams, comprising representatives from Europe, Australia, South America, and Asia took part in the competition.

Participating teams
The invited teams were the champions of Europe, Australia, South America, Japan, and the Nadeshiko League Cup.  As INAC Kobe Leonessa won both the Japanese Cup and league, the runner-up of the league was also invited.  An unidentified team from the United States was also invited but ultimately declined.  Wolfsburg, the champions of Europe, also apparently declined, and they were replaced by Chelsea.

Results

Play-off

Semifinals

Third place match

Final

Goalscorers

Prize-pool
The total prize-pool was $100,000.
1st $60,000
2nd $30,000
3rd $10,000

References

External links
Official website  

2013 in women's association football
2013
2013 in Japanese women's football
2013
2013–14 in English women's football
2013–14 in Chilean football
2013–14 in Australian women's soccer